Right Said Fred are an English pop band formed by brothers Fred and Richard Fairbrass in 1989. They are best known for the hit 1991 song "I'm Too Sexy".

History

1989–1991: Formation
Prior to forming Right Said Fred, the Fairbrass brothers had been playing music since the mid-1970s: as part of a band called The Actors, the brothers had toured with Suicide and supported Joy Division at the Factory club in Manchester.

The Fairbrass brothers formed the group in 1989, with Richard on lead vocals and bass and Fred on guitar. Prior to forming the group, Richard was employed as a session bassist for artists including Boy George, Mick Jagger and David Bowie, and appears as the bass guitarist in Bowie's short film Jazzin' for Blue Jean. In 1987, Fred appeared as a guitarist in the Bob Dylan vehicle Hearts of Fire.

The group was named after the novelty song "Right Said Fred", which was a hit single for singer and actor Bernard Cribbins in 1962. The Fairbrass brothers were originally accompanied by drummer Ray Weston and guitarist Dan Kruse. Weston left in 1990 to join the progressive rock group Wishbone Ash and Kruse left the next year. Guitarist Rob Manzoli joined in 1990 and remained with the group until 1997.

1991–1992: I’m Too Sexy and Up
In July 1991, the group released its debut single and best-known song, "I'm Too Sexy", on the independent London-based record label Tug Records. The Fairbrass brothers have stated that the song's lyrics are centred on certain users of the gym they owned in London, who they claimed had no shame. "A lot of models used our gym, so we thought it was time to start poking [fun] at them," Fred stated.

The song was a considerable hit in the United Kingdom, spending six weeks at number two in the charts behind Bryan Adams' "(Everything I Do) I Do It for You", and three months in the Top 10. The song also went to number one in 32 countries, including the United States, where it topped the Billboard Hot 100 chart. The song earned the band a nomination for an Ivor Novello award.  "I'm Too Sexy" has subsequently been used in over 40 television shows and movies, including My Wife and Kids, The Simpsons, The West Wing, and EastEnders.

Their second single, "Don't Talk Just Kiss", with background vocals by soul singer Jocelyn Brown, was released in October 1991. It made number 3 in the United Kingdom Christmas charts, entered the top five in many countries, and reached number eight in the United States dance chart.

The success of the singles resulted in the band's multi-platinum debut album, Up, reaching number one in the United Kingdom album charts as well as charting worldwide. The album remained in the Top 40 for almost a year. In Germany a fifth single "Love For All Seasons" charted at # 65 in 1993.

In 1992, Heavenly Records released an EP that featured the label's acts covering Right Said Fred songs for charity. The Fred EP contains Saint Etienne (performing "I'm Too Sexy"), The Rockingbirds ("Deeply Dippy") and Flowered Up ("Don't Talk Just Kiss").

Remainder of the 1990s

1993–1994: Sex and Travel 
Early in 1993 Fred, Richard and Rob wrote and recorded the Comic Relief single "Stick It Out", which was a top-five hit in the United Kingdom and in many European countries. In September 1993, Right Said Fred released its second album, Sex and Travel. Sex and Travel included the singles "Bumped" and "Hands Up (for Lovers)". The band received its second Ivor Novello award for "Deeply Dippy" in 1993.

1995–1996: Smashing! 
Right Said Fred parted company with Tug Records and then released its third album, Smashing!, in 1996 on the band's own label Happy Valley Records, including the singles "Living on a Dream", "Big Time" and "Everybody Loves Me".

1997–2001: Manzoli leaves, You’re My Mate and Fredhead 
Rob Manzoli left the band on friendly terms in 1997.  In 1998 Fred and Richard set up their own recording studio in London and started writing and recording what became the album Fredhead.

In 2000, Right Said Fred signed to Kingsize/BMG Berlin in Germany. The first single from Fredhead was "You're My Mate" (co-written with hard rock guitarist Myke Gray. Other singles from Fredhead were "Mojive" (Ward) and "Love Song" (Agostino Carollo).

21st century

2002–2003: Stand Up 
The second Kingsize/BMG album Stand Up was released in 2002. The lead single was "Stand Up (For the Champions)", composed by Clyde Ward and the Fairbrass brothers.

2004–2006: For Sale 
Due to family ill-health, Fred and Richard took some time out from travelling to write and record the single "We Are the Freds" and the album For Sale for the Ministry of Sound. In late 2004, Right Said Fred toured extensively in Europe.

2007–2010: I'm a Celebrity 

During 2007 and 2008, Fred and Richard collaborated with Clyde Ward to write and record their sixth album I'm a Celebrity. The album was produced by Ward, and for the United States release, Right Said Fred worked with David Levine at Promark Music. In late July 2009, Right Said Fred released "Sexy Bum" in Germany, the first single from the band's HITS! album. The band toured in support of the album in the United Kingdom and continental Europe.

2011–2012: Sexaholic 
Right Said Fred collaborated with Norwegian writers/producers Dsign Music to record Sexaholic, released in 2011.

2013–present: Raise Your Hands 
Richard spoke at an Oxford Union debate. TV appearances included an acoustic performance on the UK’s Celebrity Big Brother TV show.

RSF began writing and recording new tracks with Paul Statham (Dido, Jim Kerr, Kylie Minogue, The Saturdays). The band released the single "Sweet Treats" in January 2017 from the album Exactly! In August 2017, Right Said Fred's members Richard Fairbrass and Fred Fairbrass, were credited as songwriters alongside Taylor Swift and Jack Antonoff on the Swift single "Look What You Made Me Do". The song's chorus is an interpolation of the famous chorus from "I'm Too Sexy".

In May 2022, Phoenix Music International released the band's single "Godsend", dubbing the duo the 'UK’s most controversial band' after a number of anti-COVID-19 vaccine-themed Twitter posts and appearances in the press during the UK pandemic lockdowns. In 2022, they were involved in leafleting for British anti-climate change activist group, Not Our Future, in Oxford.

Awards and nominations
{| class="wikitable sortable plainrowheaders" 
|-
! scope="col" | Award
! scope="col" | Year
! scope="col" | Nominee(s)
! scope="col" | Category
! scope="col" | Result
! scope="col" class="unsortable"| 
|-
!scope="row" rowspan=2|Brit Awards
| rowspan=2|1993
| Themselves
| British Group
| 
| rowspan=2|
|-
| Up
| British Album of the Year
| 
|-
!scope="row" rowspan=3|Ivor Novello Awards
| rowspan=2|1992
| rowspan=2|"I'm Too Sexy"
| The Best Selling 'A' Side
| 
| rowspan=2|
|-
| rowspan=2|Most Performed Work
| 
|-
| 1993
| "Deeply Dippy"
| 
|

Discography

Studio albums

Compilation albums

Singles

Music videos

References

External links

 

Musical groups established in 1989
English dance music groups
English pop music duos
Dance-pop groups
Sibling musical duos
British musical trios
Gut Records artists
LGBT-themed musical groups
Charisma Records artists
Ivor Novello Award winners
1989 establishments in England